Jiang'an is a county of Sichuan Province, China. It is under the administration of Yibin city.

Jiang'an has one Yangtze River crossing, the Jiang'an Yangtze River Bridge.

Climate

References

Counties and districts of Yibin